Scott Anderson is a fictional character from the British Channel 4 soap opera Hollyoaks, played by Daniel Hyde.

Scott was introduced in the late-night DVD feature film Hollyoaks: Indecent Behaviour by current producer Jo Hallows. The film would see Scott's arrival as the new local bad boy who was involved in a rape storyline involving, Beth Morgan. Scott originally appeared sporadically from November 2001 to September 2002 before returning as a regular character from January 2003 to June 2004 where they made an exit but returned for three episodes in February 2005.

Many of Scott's other storylines involved his dealings in crimes such as fraud, arson, and attempted murder. Scott struck feuds with others characters most notably Darren Osborne (Ashley Taylor Dawson), Luke Morgan (Gary Lucy), and notably Ben Davies (Marcus Patric) who Scott clashed with over the affections of Izzy Cornwell (Elize du Toit). Scott has not been seen on Hollyoaks since February 2005 although Daniel Hyde appeared in the 2009 documentary Hollyoaks: The Good, the Bad, and the Gorgeous.

Development
The character was introduced in a spin-off episode released on DVD. Scott is a footballer and is accused of raping Beth Morgan (Kate Baines). Hyde then joined the main cast of Hollyoaks. The Daily Record'''s Lee-Ann Fullerton summed up his storylines: "he has bedded a 16-year-old, tried to seduce his rape accuser's best mate and been a suspected serial killer not bad for two years' work."

In February 2004, Hyde announced that he would be leaving the show in April of that year, so he could pursue other acting roles. His final scenes were to be filmed in March. Of his decision to quit, Hyde explained "I have enjoyed my time in Hollyoaks. The storylines have been great. It has been fun but it has also been tough. When you are getting really good storylines, such as the original rape story and the stuff with Izzy, you get such good things written for you. Then you have to go in and do the normal stuff too." He felt that two and a half years was "a good stretch" and that he was lucky to have been given further plots after the DVD appearance.

 Characteristics 
Written as an ambitious and possessive character, in many appearances, Scott exhibited a mean streak that could quickly offend others. However, on the show, he is also shown to be able to show prepossession characteristics and easily charms others.

Storylines
Scott first appeared in the Hollyoaks video/DVD Hollyoaks: Indecent Behaviour, where he caused a fight with Luke Morgan, forced himself on Geri Hudson, and raped Beth Morgan. This was not the first time he had taken advantage of a woman, but never was any action taken against him because he is a professional footballer.

However, Beth decided to take action against him in court, but the case was dropped after it was confirmed Beth had been talking to an outsider about the case. Scott began to have his one-night stands with sixteen-year-old Steph Dean, but soon got bored of her and dumped her. His attentions grew closer to Izzy Cornwell, and he made several attempts to seduce her. At one time it went too far. Scott would not let go of Izzy and Beth drove toward Scott and knocked him down whilst driving. This cost Scott his chances of playing in the World Cup and he never played football again because of an injury. At her trial Scott let it slip that he did actually rape her hence provoking the car attack but she is still found guilty. Beth Morgan was sentenced to six months. Scott was later convicted of perjury, for which he received a suspended prison sentence. Scott later returned as the new owner of The Loft.

Many residents of Hollyoaks, mainly Izzy, tried to protest against Scott, but he insisted that he was a changed man. With murders happening around the village, Scott was a key suspect when he was arrested but was later cleared of any charges. Scott tried to convince Izzy that he had learnt his lessons and was leading a new life, but she was still unforgiving towards him. Trouble was also brewing for Scott as Ben Davies became a rival in Hollyoaks, with Ben dating his beloved Izzy.

He then began to show two sides of his character—a caring side as he supported Ellie Hunter through her problems, and a more negative side when he led Matt Musgrove in being arrested for handling doggy fake notes. There was to be another blow for Scott when Ben and Izzy announced that they were set to get married. Scott was desperate to persuade Izzy not to marry him. After discovering from Emma Chambers, Scott told Izzy that Ben had a one-night stand with Emma and that she was carrying their child in a bid to stop Izzy from marrying Ben. Despite the attempt, it did not stop Ben and Izzy from getting married, which left Scott devastated.

A few months later, Izzy suffered a miscarriage and was told that she could never have any children. She struggled to cope with seeing Ben around with Emma's child, Arthur. Izzy confided in Scott and then slept with him. Scott's hopes were raised, as it could have been the path to finally being together with the girl of his dreams. However, it wasn't meant to be after Izzy told Scott that she only slept with him so she could cut all ties with Ben. A desperate Scott asked Izzy to give him another chance, but she did not want to know as Izzy left to make a fresh start away from Hollyoaks.

Scott felt it was useless to stay in Hollyoaks after Izzy's exit, but he was in for another surprise when his bar worker Darren Osborne had stitched up Scott for a credit card scam. Knowing it was Darren who stitched him up, Scott decided to teach him a lesson by locking the doors of The Loft and setting fire to it. Scott fell down the stairs at The Loft and pleaded to Darren for help, but Darren refused to help and managed to make his way out. Thinking that Scott was left for dead, Darren phoned the police but was shocked when no trace of Scott had been found.

A year later, Scott started threatening Darren to pay back the money. He managed to persuade Ben and Russ Owen to go with him for a deal he was set up but when they arrived at the location they saw that Scott was the person Darren owed money to. Immediately they were jumped by Scott's thugs and the three were tied up and tape gagged. They were then untied after a long calming conversation. Ben and Russ left the Flat leaving Darren to plead with Scott not to kill him. Scott was about to attack Darren when the police arrived and arrested him.

Scott later appeared in the non-canon episode Hollyoaks: The Good the Bad and the Gorgeous'' in 2009, an episode looking back at the history of the show. Scott featured in two musical numbers with the (as then) current cast.

References

Hollyoaks characters
Fictional association football players
Fictional rapists
Television characters introduced in 2001
Fictional prisoners and detainees
Male characters in television
Fictional criminals in soap operas
Fictional businesspeople